Vinaceite is a municipality located in the Bajo Martín comarca, province of Teruel, Aragon, Spain. According to the 2004 census (INE), the municipality had a population of 281 inhabitants.

References

Municipalities in the Province of Teruel